Piedmont is an unincorporated community in Montgomery County, Virginia, United States.

The name Piedmont comes from medieval Latin Pedemontium or Pedemontis, i.e., ad pedem montium, meaning "at the foot of the mountains".

The Crockett Springs Cottage and Piedmont Camp Meeting Grounds Historic District are listed on the National Register of Historic Places.

References

Unincorporated communities in Montgomery County, Virginia
Unincorporated communities in Virginia